Halocynthiibacter arcticus is a Gram-negative, rod-shaped, aerobic and non-motile  bacterium from the genus of Halocynthiibacter which has been isolated from marine sediments from the Arctic.

References 

Rhodobacteraceae
Bacteria described in 2015